Gallows Hill is a name given to a hill serving, or formerly serving, as the site of a gallows.  Such places include:

British Isles:
 Gallows Hill SSSI, Wiltshire, England, a Site of Special Scientific Interest in Wiltshire
 Gallows Hill, Lower Brailes, Warwickshire, England, on the B4035
Gallows Hill, Cratloe, County Clare, named for execution of rebels by Cromwellian forces here circa 1650 (Not British)
 Gallows Hill, Lancaster, Lancashire, England, place where Pendle witches were hanged
Gallows Hill, Otley, site of the gallows, now a nature reserve
 Gallows Hill, Ripon, North Yorkshire, England, place where 300 were hanged, 1570
 Gallow Hill Tain, Ross-shire, The last hanging took place in 1762 when, Katherine Ross, a young mother, was hanged for the murder of her child. In more recent times it was surmounted by a flagstaff but that has now disappeared. Today it is still occasionally used for rolling Easter Eggs and, when weather conditions permit, for sledging.

United States:
 Gallows Hill, Pennsylvania, an unincorporated community in Pennsylvania
 Gallows Hill, Salem, Massachusetts, place where Bridget Bishop was hanged in 1692 as part of the Salem witch trials
 Gallows Hill, Tappan, New York, place where Major John André was hanged

Australia:
 Gallows Hill, in The Rocks, Sydney, suburb

Gallows Hill may also refer to:
 Gallows Hill (novel), a 1997 supernatural thriller novel for young adults by Lois Duncan
 Gallows Hill (film), a 2013 American horror film directed by Víctor Garcia
 Gallow Hill, a hill in Scotland

See also
 Galgenberg (disambiguation), the corresponding German name
 Gibbet Hill (disambiguation), a similar name

Oronyms